Southwood Camp was a military installation at Southwood in Hampshire.

History
The camp was completed in 1939 and was used by Canadian signals and engineer units during the Second World War. It became a home for Royal Engineers training regiments after the war and, as consolidation of those regiments took place in 1959, it served as the home of 1 Training Regiment Royal Engineers in the 1960s and early 1970s. After the training units transferred to modern facilities at Gibraltar Barracks, Southwood Camp closed mid-1979. Although the military training area still exists, the site is now largely occupied by a modern housing estate which was built in the 1980s.

References

Barracks in England
1939 establishments in England